Bresles is a commune in the Oise department in northern France.

Geography

History
Its existence is attested since 1262 and the chapel of St Peter and St Paul, dating from 1312, is all that is left of a fort founded in 1212. The web page created by the Oise department (see freeoise.free.fr) mentions a famous nineteenth century opera singer by the name of Nicolas Levasseur as a significant native of Bresles, but does not mention the much more notorious French fascist leader Jacques Doriot.

Population

See also
 Communes of the Oise department

References

Communes of Oise